Dwight Davis and Holcombe Ward defeated Herbert Roper Barrett and George Simond 7–5, 6–4, 6–4 in the All Comers' Final, but the reigning champions Laurence Doherty and Reginald Doherty defeated Davis and Ward 4–6, 6–2, 6–3, 9–7 in the challenge round to win the gentlemen's doubles tennis title at the 1901 Wimbledon Championships.

Draw

Challenge round

All comers' finals

Top half

The nationality of F Japi is unknown.

Bottom half

References

External links

Gentlemen's Doubles
Wimbledon Championship by year – Men's doubles